"Tug of War" is a song by Canadian singer/songwriter Carly Rae Jepsen, released on 16 September 2008 as the second single from her debut studio album, Tug of War. The song peaked at number 36 on the Canadian Hot 100.

Music video
A music video for the song "Tug of War" was uploaded to Carly Rae Jepsen's VEVO channel on 13 July 2011 at a total length of three minutes and twenty-six seconds.

Awards
In 2010, the song was nominated for a Canadian Radio Music Award for Song of the Year.

Track listing

Chart performance

Certifications

Release history

References

External links
Official website

2008 singles
Carly Rae Jepsen songs
Songs written by Ryan Stewart (songwriter)
2008 songs
Songs written by Carly Rae Jepsen